James Holden may refer to:

Engineers
 James Holden (mechanical engineer) (fl. 1802), British mechanical engineer, see William Cockerill
 James Holden (locomotive engineer) (1837–1925), British locomotive engineer

Others
 James Holden (actor) (1920–2005), American actor
 James Holden (footballer) (born 2001), an English professional footballer who plays as a goalkeeper 
 James Holden (producer) (born 1979), electronic music artist and producer
 James Bismark Holden (1876–1956), politician from Alberta, Canada
 James Stuart Holden (1914–1996), U.S. federal judge
 James Alexander Holden (1835–1887), businessman in South Australia
 James Holden, character in The Expanse novel series by James S.A. Corey, and its television adaptation